I. chinensis  may refer to:
 Iris chinensis or Ixia chinensis, synonyms for Iris domestica, the blackberry lily, leopard flower or leopard lily, an ornamental plant species
 Ixonanthes chinensis, a plant species found in China and Vietnam

See also
 Chinensis (disambiguation)